The 1993 Salem Open Hong Kong was a men's tennis tournament played on outdoor hard courts on Hong Kong Island in Hong Kong that was part of the World Series of the 1993 ATP Tour. It was the 18th edition of the tournament and was held from 12 April through 18 April 1993. Second-seeded Pete Sampras won the singles title and earned $39,600 first-prize money.

Finals

Singles
 Pete Sampras defeated  Jim Courier 6–3, 6–7(1–7), 7–6(7–2)
 It was Sampras' 4th singles title of the year and the 17th of his career.

Doubles
 David Wheaton /  Todd Woodbridge defeated  Sandon Stolle /  Jason Stoltenberg 6–1, 6–3
 It was Wheaton's only doubles title of the year and the 2nd of his career. It was Woodbridge's 3rd doubles title of the year and the 19th of his career.

References

External links
 ITF tournament edition details

Salem Open
Hong Kong Open (tennis)
1993 in Hong Kong sport